Igloo Records is a record label run by the concert hall running company Sowarex in Brussels, Belgium that concentrates on jazz and world music. Igloo is the best-known of five imprints run by Sowarex. According to one of its founders, the label was developed when the local scene was enhanced by the arrival of American jazzmen that included JR Montrose and Chet Baker.

 Igloo, created in 1978, has released albums by Belgian jazz musicians Anne Wolf, Charles Loos, Diederik Wissels, Eric Legnini, Félix Simtaine, Ivan Paduart, Jacques Pelzer, Mélanie De Biasio, Michel Herr, Nathalie Loriers, Pascal Schumacher, Philip Catherine, Philippe Aerts, Manu Louis, drummer Antoine Pierre (Urbex) and Steve Houben.
 Rainland released English-speaking projects by Klaus Klang, Tom Wolf, Owen Curtiz and others but folded in 1994.
 IglooMondo was set up in 2005 and is home to world-based projects such as Mokoomba, Majid Bekkas, the late Wendo Kolosoy and Manou Gallo. 
 Iglectic releases left-field material such as Flat Earth Society, X-Legged Sally and L'Ensemble Musique Nouvelles. 
 Factice, created in 2013, showcases Belgian French-speaking artists such as Mochélan, Karim Gharbi and Tomassenko.

Together, the labels have released almost 350 CDs over a period spanning 40 years.

References

External links
 Official company website
 Discography on Discogs

Belgian record labels
Jazz record labels